Intelligence Organization of the Islamic Revolutionary Guard Corps is an Iranian intelligence agency within the Islamic Revolutionary Guard Corps (IRGC) and part of Council for Intelligence Coordination. The Intelligence Organization of the Islamic Revolutionary Guard Corps was established on Khamanei's initiative in 2009.

According to Stratfor, it is as powerful as Ministry of Intelligence and possibly even more powerful than the other service. The agency appears to be more active at a domestic level while at an international level, the Quds Force is the key operational group. The agency also has a wide range of Basij informers. It has been described as a "more ideological counterpart" to the ministry of the Iranian government devoted to intelligence,  (the Ministry of Intelligence and Security), which it
"overshadows" and "often" overrules, according to the New York Times.

Senior officials 
 Chairman: Mohammad Kazemi (from 2022)
 Deputy: Hassan Mohaqeq (from 2019)
 Vice-Chairman: Mahdi Sayyari (from 2016)

See also 
 Parallel Intelligence Agency

References 

Iranian intelligence agencies
Iranian security organisations
Military intelligence agencies
Islamic Revolutionary Guard Corps